Jacqueline Börner (later Schubert, born 30 March 1965) is a former speed skater.

Jacqueline Börner won her first international medal when she earned bronze at the 1987 European Allround Championships. Two years later, she won bronze again. A top skater in her own right, Börner often finished behind compatriots such as Gunda Kleemann and Andrea Mitscherlich.

In 1990, Börner initially had a very good year when she won silver at the European Allround Championships behind Kleemann and then became World Allround Champion the following month, having had some luck that Kleemann was disqualified after her 1500 m race. One month later, Börner won that season's World Cup on the 1500 m, having performed the best over 8 World Cup races on that distance during that season. In August of that year, though, she got hit by an automobile while training on her bicycle, resulting in torn anterior cruciate ligaments.

Having recovered from her injuries, Börner returned to competition at the World Cup meeting in November 1991 and promptly won bronze on the 1500 m. After having finished 6th in the 1992 European Allround Championships, Börner participated in the 1992 Winter Olympics in Albertville and surprisingly beat Gunda Kleemann (who had since gotten married and was known as Gunda Niemann then) on the 1500 m by 0.05 seconds to become Olympic Champion.

Börner retired from speed skating at the end of 1996, although she participated in one more tournament (one for skaters of 35 years or older) in 2000.

Medals
An overview of medals won by Börner at important championships she participated in, listing the years in which she won each:

Personal records

Börner has an Adelskalender score of 170.874 points. Her highest ranking on the Adelskalender was a 5th place.

References
Jacqueline Börner at SkateResults.com 
Jacqueline Börner at DESG (Deutsche Eisschnelllauf Gemeinschaft) (in German)

1965 births
Living people
People from Wismar
People from Bezirk Rostock
German female speed skaters
Sportspeople from Mecklenburg-Western Pomerania
Olympic speed skaters of Germany
Speed skaters at the 1992 Winter Olympics
Medalists at the 1992 Winter Olympics
Olympic medalists in speed skating
Olympic gold medalists for Germany
Recipients of the Silver Laurel Leaf
World Allround Speed Skating Championships medalists
20th-century German women